Limhamn-Bunkeflo was a city district in the west and south of Malmö Municipality, Sweden. On 1 July 2013, it was merged with Hyllie, forming Väster. In 2012, Limhamn-Bunkeflo had a population of 42,646 of the municipality's 307,758. The area was 5,147 hectares.

Neighbourhoods
The neighbourhoods of Limhamn-Bunkeflo were:

References

Former city districts of Malmö